Julio Moreno (born 12 June 1995 in Quito) is a racing driver from Ecuador. He has formerly competed in the FIA Formula 3 European Championship and Euroformula Open Championship.

Racing Record

Career summary

References

External links
Profile at Driver Database

Ecuadorian racing drivers
1995 births
Living people
Formula Ford drivers
Formula Renault 2.0 NEC drivers
Formula Renault Eurocup drivers
FIA Formula 3 European Championship drivers
Euroformula Open Championship drivers
Manor Motorsport drivers
MP Motorsport drivers
T-Sport drivers
Campos Racing drivers